Matthew Wesenbeck (25 October 1531 – 5 June 1586) was a Belgian jurist and a student of Gabriel Mudaeus. His Latin surname was also spelled Wesembecius or Vesembecius.

Wesenbeck was a Protestant writer widely known and cited during his time. He taught at Jena and Wittenberg.

Works
 Paratitla in Pandectarum iuris civilis libros quinquaginta (1566)
 Tractatus et responsa quae vulgo consilia appelantur (1576)
 Tractatus de feudis

References

1531 births
1586 deaths
Lawyers of the Habsburg Netherlands